Peter Kuhl Martin IV (born March 30, 1977) is an American politician. He was a member of the Georgia State Senate from the 9th district, from 2015 to 2021. He is a member of the Republican Party.

References

Georgia (U.S. state) Republicans
21st-century American politicians
People from Lawrenceville, Georgia
Living people
1977 births